Frank Elmer Huelsman (June 5, 1874 – June 9, 1959) was an American professional baseball left fielder, who played in Major League Baseball (MLB) for the St. Louis Browns, Chicago White Sox, Detroit Tigers, St. Louis Browns, and Washington Senators.

Out of the majors for six full seasons, he later achieved the rare distinction of being the first player in major league history to play for four different teams in a season.
 
He hit .245 (97-for-396) in 112 games that season, including two home runs and 35 RBI.

In January , the Boston Americans obtained outfielder George Stone from the Senators. Then, the Browns reclaimed Huelsman from Washington, where he had been on loan, and sent him along with outfielder Jesse Burkett to Boston in exchange for Stone. Boston then sent Huelsman back to Washington in payment for Stone. For Huelsman, it was his eighth transaction in less than a year. Nevertheless, he enjoyed a good season with the Senators, hitting .271 with three home runs and 62 RBI in 121 games, including 48 runs, 28 doubles, eight triples, and 11 stolen bases – all career-numbers, but he was sent down in 1906, and was never called back up. 
 
In a three-season career, Huelsman was a .258 hitter with five home runs and 97 RBI in 235 games.
 
Following his Major League Baseball career, Huelsman became a minor league star, compiling a .342 career average over nearly 20 years, including five batting titles and six RBI titles. While playing for the Salt Lake City Skyscrapers in the Class D Union Association, Huelsman won two Triple Crowns between 1911 and 1913, narrowly missing a third Triple Crown in 1912 by .002 points in batting average.

Huelsman died in Affton, Missouri, just four days after his 85th birthday.

References

Sources
1904 Detroit Tigers
Baseball Library
Baseball Reference
Retrosheet

1874 births
1959 deaths
Major League Baseball left fielders
St. Louis Browns (NL) players
Chicago White Sox players
Detroit Tigers players
St. Louis Browns players
Washington Senators (1901–1960) players
19th-century baseball players
Baseball players from St. Louis
Danville Champions players
Peoria Distillers players
Shreveport Giants players
Portland Browns players
Spokane Indians players
Montreal Royals players
Kansas City Blues (baseball) players
Harrisburg Senators players
New Orleans Pelicans (baseball) players
Mobile Sea Gulls players
Great Falls Electrics players
Salt Lake City Skyscrapers players
Albuquerque Dukes players
Omaha Rourkes players
Sherman Hitters players